Mikhail Osipovich Razumov (1894 - October 30, 1937) was a Ukrainian revolutionary and  Soviet politician. He was Second Secretary of the Rybinsk Regional Committee (1922-1923), Second Secretary of the Orlov Regional Committee (1923-1924), Second Secretary of the Bashkortostan Communist Party (1924-1927), First Secretary of the Tatarstan Communist Party (1928-1933) and First Secretary of the East Siberian Regional Committee (1933 - May 1937). He was a member of the Central Committee elected by the 17th Congress of the All-Union Communist Party (Bolsheviks) from 1934 to June 23, 1937. Razumov was executed during the Great Purge.

Bibliography
 Разумов М. И. Год работы и ближайшие задачи Татарской партийной организации. Казань, 1929.
 Разумов М. И. Выйти в ряды передовых. Иркутск, 1934. 30 000 экз.
 Разумов М. И. Победно завершить сельскохозяйственный год. Иркутск, 1934. 25 000 экз.
 Разумов М. И. Хозяйственный подъём и культурное строительство Восточной Сибири. Иркутск, 1935. 15 000 экз.
 Разумов М. И. О проекте Конституции СССР. Иркутск, 1936.

References

Sources
 Библиотека AZ-LIBR — Разумов Михаил Осипович
 Справочник по истории КПСС — Разумов Михаил Осипович
 Михаил Осипович Разумов 
 Михаил Осипович Разумов 

1894 births
1937 deaths
Great Purge victims from Russia
People executed by the Soviet Union